Andrés Eduardo Fernández Moreno (born 17 December 1986) is a Spanish professional footballer who plays for SD Huesca as a goalkeeper.

He spent most of his career with Osasuna, making his first-team debut in 2007 and going on to appear in 115 official matches. He also played four seasons with Villarreal, having signed in 2016 on loan.

Club career

Osasuna
Fernández was born in Murcia. After one year with RCD Mallorca's reserves, he was promoted to CA Osasuna's first team for 2007–08 and played once during that season, in a 2–0 La Liga away loss against UD Almería on 21 October 2007 as starter Ricardo was suspended and Juan Elía was sent off in the 50th minute. 

The following years, Fernández continued to be third choice as well as the starter at the B side in the Segunda División B. In mid-July 2010, after consecutively helping the Navarrese's reserves to retain their top-flight status but failing to move up the first team's pecking order, he joined Segunda División club SD Huesca on loan. 

Fernández returned for 2011–12 as Asier Riesgo's backup – the 39-year-old Ricardo was still on the roster – replacing the latter due to injury during the first half of a 0–0 draw at Atlético Madrid and eventually finishing the campaign as first choice, appearing in all 38 league games and conceding 61 goals.

Porto
On 30 July 2014, Fernández signed a four-year contract with FC Porto, with the buyout clause being set at €30 million. He became the fifth Spaniard to join the Portuguese club after compatriot Julen Lopetegui took over two months earlier.

Fernández made only four appearances during his spell, each in a different competition. His Primeira Liga debut was on 21 September 2014, in a goalless home draw with Boavista F.C. in the Derby da Invicta.

Fernández was loaned to Granada CF on 17 July 2015, in a season-long move. On 25 July of the following year, after playing all the matches but one to help his team again retain their top-tier status, he moved to Villarreal CF of the same league also in a temporary deal.

Villarreal
On 22 June 2017, Fernández joined Villarreal on a permanent four-year deal. He had finished his first season as starter due to Sergio Asenjo's serious knee injury but, on 25 August, during a league game away to Real Sociedad, met the same fate.

Fernández played second-fiddle to Asenjo until his departure, save for a brief period at the end of 2018–19.

Huesca
On 28 August 2020, Fernández agreed to a three-year contract at SD Huesca, newly promoted to the top division.

Club statistics

References

External links

1986 births
Living people
Footballers from Murcia
Spanish footballers
Association football goalkeepers
La Liga players
Segunda División players
Segunda División B players
Tercera División players
RCD Mallorca B players
CA Osasuna B players
CA Osasuna players
SD Huesca footballers
Granada CF footballers
Villarreal CF players
Primeira Liga players
FC Porto players
Spanish expatriate footballers
Expatriate footballers in Portugal
Spanish expatriate sportspeople in Portugal